Sébastien Turbot (born 25 October 1976), is a French social entrepreneur.

Life
Turbot is the CEO and Chief Curator of eko6, a Canada-based consultancy that guides governments, cities, businesses and civil-society in creating engaging platforms that turn ideas into action. Sebastien’s work focuses on designing creative learning and living ecosystems that help communities develop skills and talents they need to address the evolving needs and complexities of current and future societies.

As Board Member of Montreal International, Sébastien is actively supporting the city of Montréal’s attractiveness and competitiveness strategy notably on attracting, training and retaining skilled individuals. He is the former executive director at the New Cities Foundation and former Culture(s) & Content Curator (TBWA, AUDITOIRE) and Global Director at Qatar Foundation's World Innovation Summit for Education. He is a Fellow at the Royal Society for the encouragement of Arts, Manufactures and Commerce (RSA) and an advisory board member at Samuel Hall Consulting, a research and strategic consulting firm. Turbot is a lecturer and a frequently requested advisor and speaker at national and international conferences.

In 2010, he joined TEDx Paris as the editorial director. In this role, he defined and designed the initiative's content strategy..

Prior to this, Turbot spent nearly a decade in Afghanistan. His interest in the global aid and development sector led him to establish Sayara Strategies (in 2004), a social communication agency that develops innovative strategies for complex environments. Turbot is also a board member at Afghanistan Libre, a not-for-profit founded by Chékéba Hachemi that fosters education for girls in Afghanistan.

Valentin Spidault, a prominent fictiticious character featured in Nicolas Wild's best-selling comic “Kabul Disco” is based on Turbot's engagement with Sayara Strategies.

Turbot has been a senior lecturer at the Paris School of International Affairs (PSIA), Sciences-Po, Paris  and has also taught at the French journalism and communication school CELSA Paris, which is part of the Paris-Sorbonne University.

A former journalist, Turbot worked for FRANCE 5's C dans l'air in 2003. In the past, he has also been Public Affairs and Communication consultant in countries such as Brazil, Djibouti and Afghanistan.

Turbot often writes articles featured on various online media and content portals including Forbes, Entrepreneur, the Skoll World Forum, LinkedIn Pulse and the World Economic Forum's Agenda blog.

Publications and articles 
 La Crise de l'éducation TEDxLaRochelle
 Introducing The ‘Selfie Generation’ To The Real World (Huffington Post)
 Confidence Is the Currency of the Future (Entrepreneur.com)
 How Strong Community And Educator Support Drives Ed Tech Success (Forbes)
Afghanistan: Bringing Girls (Back) to School (Forbes)
 The Web Connects Me to the World, But Conferences Unite Me With My Tribe (Entrepreneur.com)
 You, Too, Can Hack for Good Causes (Christian Science Monitor)
 Let's applaud our silent heroes of social change (Devex)
 Educate Girls, Transform Communities (Skoll World Forum)
 Online to Onsite: Communication to the Rescue (Skoll World Forum)
 Is Higher Education Equipping Young People for the Jobs Market? (World Economic Forum - Agenda)
Should My Kids Learn to Code (LinkedIn Pulse)
 Has the “Innovation in Education” Bubble Popped? (LinkedIn Pulse)

Awards and honors
Turbot was awarded the Etoile Européenne du Mérite Civil et Militaire in 2002.

References

External links 
 Interview (Spanish) Famosos se la juegan por dar "escena" a la educación El Mercurio
 
 
 
 
 

Social entrepreneurs
1976 births
Living people